Chryseobacterium geocarposphaerae  is a Gram-negative and rod-shaped bacteria from the genus of Chryseobacterium which has been isolated from soil around peanuts (Arachis hypogaea) in Alabama in the United States.

References

Further reading

External links
Type strain of Chryseobacterium geocarposphaerae at BacDive -  the Bacterial Diversity Metadatabase

geocarposphaerae
Bacteria described in 2014